41 Canadian Brigade Group (41 CBG) is a Canadian Army formation of the 3rd Canadian Division. The formation is composed of Army Reserve units within the province of Alberta and the Northwest Territories. The headquarters of the brigade is in Calgary.

The brigade has an establishment of 2,500 all ranks.  The role of the Army Reserve is to be "a professional part-time force that provides local engagement and a responsive integrated capability, at home or abroad, in sustainment of the Army mission."  Most of the soldiers within the brigade serve part time in units or sub-units stationed in their communities.  As the Canadian Army generates task-specific units for employment on expeditionary and domestic operations under the command of the Canadian Joint Operations Command, 41 CBG, as a force generator, is tasked with the following:

 On order provide general-purpose, combat-capable soldiers and specialist sub-subunits (troops or platoons) capable of augmenting the Regular Force on expeditionary operations; and
 On order provide a domestic response unit (Territorial Battalion Group), sub-units (Direct Response Companies), or sub-sub-units (Direct Response Platoons or Local Response Platoons) capable of augmenting the Regular Force on domestic operations.

Corporate identity

Brigade units

History
There are two constants in the organization of the institution that is the Canadian Army, the "Army Headquarters" and the "Units".  For effective and efficient intermediate command and control, formations such as Corps, Areas, Divisions, Districts, Brigades and Brigade Groups were routinely organized, redesignated, reorganized, or disbanded as required.  41 Canadian Brigade Group is but the latest incarnation of the following fifteen Militia formations that have commanded the Alberta-based Army Reserve units since 1910:
5th Cavalry Brigade (1910–12)
Headquartered in Calgary
Units under command:
15th Light Horse
19th Alberta Mounted Rifles (redesignated to 19th Alberta Dragoons in 1911)
21st Alberta Hussars, and (left the Brigade in 1911)
23rd Alberta Rangers
25th Battery, C.F.A. (joined the Brigade in 1911)
4th Field Troop, C.E. (joined the Brigade in 1911)
No. 14 Company, C.A.S.C. (joined the Brigade in 1911)
No. 17 Cavalry Field Ambulance (joined the Brigade in 1911)
5th Mounted Brigade (1912–36)
Headquartered in Calgary (1912–19, 1928–30), Edmonton (1920–27, 1931–34), Pincher Creek (1935–36)
Units under command:
15th Light Horse (redesignated 15th Canadian Light Horse in 1922)
South Alberta Horse (joined Brigade in 1931 - left the Brigade in 1932)
19th Alberta Dragoons
23rd Alberta Rangers (left the Brigade in 1922)
25th Battery, C.F.A. (left the Brigade in 1922)
5th Cavalry Brigade Ammunition Column (redesignated 5th Mounted Brigade Ammunition Column – Between 1919 and 1922)
4th Field Troop, C.E. (left the Brigade 1922)
Wireless Telegraph Detachment, C.E. (left the Brigade 1922)
No. 14 Company, C.A.S.C. (left the Brigade 1922)
No. 17 Cavalry Field Ambulance (left the Brigade 1922)
The Alberta Mounted Rifles (joined the Brigade in 1922)
24th Infantry Brigade (1922–36)
Headquartered in Calgary
Units under command:
1st Battalion, The Edmonton Regiment (left the Brigade in 1923 to join 29th Infantry Brigade)
2nd Battalion, The Edmonton Regiment (left the Brigade in 1923 to join 29th Infantry Brigade)
1st Battalion, The Calgary Regiment (redesignated to The Calgary Highlanders in 1924)
2nd Battalion, The Calgary Regiment (redesignated to The Calgary Regiment in 1924)
1st Battalion, The Alberta Regiment (redesignated to The South Alberta Regiment in 1924)
2nd Battalion, The Alberta Regiment (left the Brigade in 1923 to join 29th Infantry Brigade)
Disbanded effective 14 December 1936 under General Order 73/1937 dated 29 April 1937#
29th Infantry Brigade (1923–36)
Headquartered in Edmonton
Units under command:
1st Battalion, The Edmonton Regiment (redesignated as the Edmonton Regiment in 1924)
2nd Battalion, The Edmonton Regiment (redesignated as the Edmonton Fusiliers in 1924)
2nd Battalion, The Alberta Regiment (redesignated as the North Alberta Regiment in 1924)
Disbanded effective 14 December 1936 under General Order 73/1937 dated 29 April 1937
2nd (Reserve) Cavalry Brigade (1936–46)
Organized effective 15 December 1936 under General Order 71/1937 dated 29 April 1937
Headquartered in Pincher Creek (1936–38) Chauvin, Alberta (1939-42)
Units under command:
15th Alberta Light Horse
19th Alberta Dragoons
Disbanded on 31 March 1946 under General Order 113/46 dated 13 May 1946
3rd (Reserve) Infantry Brigade (1936–46)
Headquartered in Calgary
Units under command:
The South Alberta Regiment
The Edmonton Fusiliers
The Edmonton Regiment
The Calgary Highlanders 
The Calgary Regiment (attached)
Reorganized and redesignated to 18th Infantry Brigade effective 1 April 1946 under General Order 116/46 dated 13 May 1946
41st (Reserve) Brigade Group (1942–46)
Formed on 1 April 1942
Headquartered in Edmonton until 1 April 1943 then Calgary
Units under command:
14th (Reserve) Armoured Regiment, RCAC (Calgary Regiment)
29th (Reserve) Reconnaissance Regiment, RCAC (South Alberta Regiment)
41st (Reserve) Field Regiment, R.C.A.
13th (Reserve) Field Company, R.C.E.
E and J sections, No.13 (Reserve) District Signals, R.C.C.S.
4th (Reserve) Armoured Divisional Signals, R.C.C.S.
2nd (Reserve) Battalion, The Edmonton Fusiliers
2nd (Reserve) Battalion, The Calgary Highlanders
2nd (Reserve) Battalion, The Edmonton Regiment
No.2 Group, No.10 (Reserve) Divisional Workshop, R.C.O.C.
No.41 (Reserve) Light Aid Detachment (Type A), R.C.O.C.
No.42 (Reserve) Light Aid Detachment (Type B), R.C.O.C.
No.43 (Reserve) Light Aid Detachment (Type B), R.C.O.C.
No.44 (Reserve) Light Aid Detachment (Type B), R.C.O.C.
No.8 (Reserve) Field Ambulance, R.C.A.M.C.
Disbanded on 30 January 1946 under General Order 86/1946 dated 2 April 1946
18th Infantry Brigade (1946–54)
Organized effective 15 December 1936 under General Order 73/1937 dated 29 April 1937
Headquartered in Edmonton
Reorganized and redesignated from 3rd (Reserve) Infantry Brigade to 18th Infantry Brigade effective 1 April 1946 under General Order 116/46 dated 13 May 1946#
22 Militia Group (1954–65)
Headquartered in Calgary
Units under command:
The South Alberta Light Horse
The King's Own Calgary Regiment (RCAC)
18th Field Regiment, RCA
19th Medium Regiment, RCA
8th Field Engineer Regiment, RCE
7th Independent Signals Squadron, RCCS
The Calgary Highlanders
7th Column, R.C.A.S.C.
21st Medical Company, R.C.A.M.C.
59th Dental Unit, R.C.D.C.
6th Ordnance Company, R.C.O.C.
9th Technical Regiment, R.C.E.M.E.
23 Militia Group (1954–65)
Headquartered in Wainwright
Alberta Militia District (1965–68)
Northern Alberta Militia District (1968–91)
Headquartered in Edmonton
Southern Alberta Militia District (1968–91)
Headquartered in Calgary
Alberta District (1991–97)
Headquartered in Calgary
Units under command:
The South Alberta Light Horse
The King's Own Calgary Regiment (RCAC)
20th Field Regiment, RCA
18th Air Defence Regiment, RCA
8th Field Engineer Regiment, RCE
33rd Field Engineer Squadron, RCE
The Loyal Edmonton Regiment
The Calgary Highlanders
14th (Calgary) Service Battalion
15th (Edmonton) Service Battalion
41 Canadian Brigade Group (1997–Present)

Past commanders of Alberta's Militia formations
5th Cavalry Brigade
Colonel J. Walker (1910–11)
Colonel R. Belcher, C.M.G. (1911–12)
5th Mounted Brigade
Colonel R. Belcher, C.M.G. (1912–19)
Colonel (later Brigadier-General) W.A. Griesbach, C.B., C.M.G., D.S.O. (1919–23)
Colonel C.Y. Weaver, D.S.O. (1923–26)
Colonel H.C.A. Hervey, V.D. (1926–30)
Colonel W.G. MacFarlane, V.D. (1930–31)
Colonel H. de. N. Watson, C.B.E. (1931–34)
Lieutenant-Colonel W.W. Henderson, V.D. (1934–36)
24th Infantry Brigade
Vacant (1922–23)
Colonel G. MacDonald, V.D. (1923–26)
Colonel D.L. Redman (1926–30)
Colonel D.G.L. Cunnington, O.B.E., M.C., V.D. (1930–35)
Colonel E.R. Knight, V.D. (1935–36)
29th Infantry Brigade
Colonel F.C. Jamieson (1923–27)
Lieutenant-Colonel T.C. Sims (1927–29)
Colonel A.C. Gillespie, V.D. (1929–33)
Colonel A.W. Bannard, M.M. (1933–36)
2nd (Reserve) Cavalry Brigade
Colonel W.W. Henderson, V.D. (1936–39)
Colonel A.E. Pittman (1938–42)
Headquarters Dormant (1942–46)
3rd (Reserve) Infantry Brigade
Colonel E.R. Knight, V.D. (1936–38)
Colonel N.D. Dingle (1938–42)
Headquarters Dormant (1942–46)
41st (Reserve) Brigade Group
Colonel E.R. Knight, V.D. (1942–45)
Brigadier G.R. Bradbrooke, M.C. (1945–46)
18th Infantry Brigade
Brigadier J.C. Jefferson, C.B.E., D.S.O. and Bar, E.D. (1946–48)
Brigadier R.C. Coleman, D.S.O., M.C. (1948–50)
Brigadier J.W. Proctor, O.B.E., E.D. (1950–54)
22 Militia Group
Brigadier F.T. Jenner, M.B.E., E.D. (1954)
Colonel (later Brigadier) T.B. Nash, D.S.O., C.D. (1954–56)
Colonel H.W. MacEwing, C.D. (1956–57)
Colonel (later Brigadier) H.T.R. Gregg, C.D. (1957–61)
Brigadier (later Major-General) W.A. Howard, C.M., C.M.M., C.D. (1961–65)
23 Militia Group
Vacant (1954–58)
Brigadier R.A. Bradburn, E.D. (1958–61)
Colonel G.J. Armstrong, C.D. (1963–65)
Alberta Militia District
Colonel G.J. Armstrong, C.D. (1965–66)
Colonel M.F. MacLauchlan, O.B.E., M.C., C.D. (1966–68)
Northern Alberta Militia District
Colonel G.J. Armstrong, C.D. (1968–69)
Colonel A.T. Hutton, C.D. (1969–72)
Colonel D.D. Kuchinski, C.D. (1972–73)
Colonel W.G. Ames, O.M.M., C.D. (1973–76)
Colonel A.B. Mottershead, C.D. (1976–79)
Colonel A.R. Gebauer, C.D. (1979–83)
Colonel W.F. Joyce, C.D. (1983–87)
Colonel C.G. Marshall, O.M.M., C.D. (1987–90)
Colonel D.D. Miller, C.D. (1991)
Southern Alberta Militia District
Vacant (1968–70)
Colonel L.S. Thompson C.D. (1970–73)
Colonel (later Brigadier-General) H.O Wagg, K.St.J., C.D. (1973–75)
Colonel G.D. Stewart, C.D. (1975–77)
Colonel R.O. Jacobson, C.D. (1977–80)
Colonel S.E. Blakely, C.D. (1980–83)
Colonel P.F. Hughes, C.D. (1983–87)
Colonel (later Brigadier-General) R.S. Millar, O.M.M., C.D. (1987–90)
Colonel J. Fletcher, C.D. (1990–91)
Alberta District
Colonel J. Fletcher, C.D. (1991—94)
Colonel (later Brigadier-General) R.S. Millar, O.M.M., C.D. (1994-1996)
Colonel T. Wolf, C.D. (1996–97)
41 Canadian Brigade Group
Colonel M. Quinn, C.D. (1997-2000)
Colonel C. Hamel, C.D. (2000–02)
Colonel (later Major-General) J.G. Milne, M.S.M., C.D. (2003)
Colonel J.D. Gludo, C.D. (2003–06)
Colonel A. Wreidt, C.D. (2006–09)
Colonel (later Brigadier-General) T. Putt, M.S.M., C.D. (2009–10)
Colonel (later Major-General) P. Bury, O.M.M., C.D. (2010–11)
Lieutenant-Colonel M.J. Delaney, C.D. (2011)
Colonel R.C. Boehli, C.D. (2011–13)
Colonel J.D. Conrad, M.S.M., C.D. (2013–16)
Colonel E. van Weelderen, C.D. (2016–19)
Colonel M.C. Vernon, C.D. (2019–22)

Past sergeants-major of 41 Canadian Brigade Group
Chief Warrant Officer (later Lieutenant-Colonel) R.F. Cruickshank, M.M.M., C.D. (1997)
Chief Warrant Officer P. Tamblyn, M.M.M., C.D. (1997-2000)
Chief Warrant Officer P.J. Wonderham, M.M.M., C.D. (2000–03)
Chief Warrant Officer R.L. Page, M.M.M., C.D. (2003–04)
Chief Warrant Officer (later Major) K.J. Griffiths, M.M.M., C.D. (2004–07)
Chief Warrant Officer (later Captain) A.M.R. Brunelle, C.D. (2007–10)
Chief Warrant Officer A.M. Thomas, C.D. (2010–12)
Chief Warrant Officer E.G. Kelly, M.S.M., C.D. (2012–15)
Chief Warrant Officer (later Captain) M.B. Talty, M.M.M., C.D. (2015–19)
Chief Warrant Officer R.S. Doyle, C.D. (2019–22)

References

Brigades of the Canadian Army
Military units and formations established in 1997
Organizations based in Calgary
1997 establishments in Alberta